The Swedish National Forensic Centre (NFC) — previously known as the National Swedish Criminal Police Registry and Forensic Laboratories (1939–1964) (SKA) and the National Swedish Laboratory of Forensic Science (1964–2015) (SKL) — is a Swedish government agency, organized under the Ministry of Justice as a department of the Swedish Police Authority. It is tasked with assisting the Swedish police in investigating crimes. The agency performs laboratory analyses of samples which have been taken from various types of crime scenes. The laboratory has expertise in most science disciplines and uses technology to find and preserve trace evidence and to establish links between people, places and objects.

Organisation 

NFC is run by the head of the lab, under him or her there is a staff and an administrative unit. Below them there are four units: 
the biological unit, 
the drug analysis unit, 
the chemical and technical unit, and
the document and information technology unit.
Apart from forensic analysis the staff of the lab performs research and development in the field of forensic sciences as well as teaching forensic science. The lab has about 285 employees.

See also
 Swedish National Board of Forensic Medicine

References

External links 

Government agencies of Sweden
National law enforcement agencies of Sweden
Forensics organizations